Bachhalā (Nepal Bhasa: बछला) is the seventh month in the Nepal Era calendar, the national lunar calendar of Nepal. The month coincides with Vaisakha (वैसाख) in the Hindu lunar calendar and May in the Gregorian calendar.

Bachhalā begins with the new moon and the full moon falls on the 15th of the lunar month. The month is divided into the bright and dark fortnights which are known as Bachhalā Thwa (बछला थ्व) and Bachhalā Gā (बछला गा) respectively.

Among the most important festivals of the month, Bunga Dyah Jatra, the chariot pulling festival of the Buddhist deity Red Avalokiteśvara, begins at Patan on the 4th day of the bright fortnight.

The full moon day of Baisākh Purnimā (वैसाख पुर्णिमा) is one of the year's most widely celebrated holidays. It is known as Swānyā Punhi (स्वांया पुन्हि) in Nepal Bhasa and means "Full Moon Day of Flowers". The holiday celebrates three events in the Buddha's life—his birth, enlightenment and Nirvana.

Days in the month

Months of the year

References

Months
Nepali calendar
Nepalese culture